"A Woman's Touch" is a song co-written and recorded by American country music artist Toby Keith. It was released in July 1996 as the second single from his 1996 album Blue Moon.  It peaked at number 6 in the United States, and number 11 in Canada. Keith wrote this song with Wayne Perry.

Critical reception
Larry Flick, of Billboard magazine reviewed the song favorably saying that "Keith's warm baritone wraps around the lyric and brings the song to life with the authority of a man who has been there."

Chart positions
"A Woman's Touch" debuted at number 73 on the Hot Country Singles & Tracks chart for the week of July 13, 1996.

Year-end charts

References

1996 singles
Toby Keith songs
Songs written by Toby Keith
A&M Records singles
Songs written by Wayne Perry (country music)
1996 songs